The former independent municipality of Sprötze in the north German state of Lower Saxony was merged in 1972 with another five villages into the town of Buchholz in der Nordheide.

Transportation 
The village of Sprötze lies on the B 3 federal road between Trelde and Welle.
Sprötze has a station on the main line from Bremen to Hamburg, and is part of the Hamburg Transport Network.

History 
Sprötze was first mentioned in 1105 as Sproccinla. At that time the inhabitants had just celebrated the 900th anniversary of their village. Its name changed over the course of time through Spretzenlo, Sprotzelo, Sprotzel and Sprötzel to the present-day name of Sprötze. 
Sprötze has a fine brick church from the last century.

Features 
From here the Nordheide ("North Heath") can be viewed.

The Sprötze shooting festival takes place on the second weekend of August, finishing with a big firework display.

In 1992 in Sprötze the VooV Experience was first held. Since 2001, however, it has moved to Putlitz.

In his book Der tiefere Sinn des Labenz, Sven Böttcher describes Sprötze as a "mixture of toothpaste and spit in a basin".

Sport
Sprötze shares a football club, Sg Estetal ("Este Valley Sports Club"), with the village of Trelde. Another club, TSV-Sprötze has a range of sporting activities and even dancing classes.

Sprötze and the neighbouring village of Kakenstorf have a shooting club offering archery, clay pigeon shooting, small arms and air gun shooting.

References

External links 
www.sproetze.de
www.buchholz.de

Villages in Lower Saxony